Belenois creona, the African common white or African caper, is a butterfly in the family Pieridae. It is found in the Afrotropical realm.

Description

The wingspan is 40–45 mm.  The sexes are dimorphic.

Males
Uppersides are white with black or brown marginal borders and veins in forewing apex. There is a black spot in the upperside cell, instead of a bar as in the brown-veined white (B. aurota).

Females
Females have broader dark upperside borders on both wings. Underwings are yellow during the wet season.

Ecology
The larvae feed on Capparis and Maerua species.

Subspecies
The following subspecies are recognised:
 B. c. creona (Senegal to Nigeria, Sudan, east Ethiopia)
 B. c. benadirensis (in Somalia)
 B. c. boguensis Ethiopia
 B. c. elisa (on the Comoros)
 B. c. leucogyne (on the Arabian Peninsula)
 B. c. prorsus (on Madagascar)
 B. c. severina (South Africa to east Africa, Democratic Republic of the Congo)

References

External links
Seitz, A. Die Gross-Schmetterlinge der Erde 13: Die Afrikanischen Tagfalter. Plate XIII 13
Seitz, A. Die Gross-Schmetterlinge der Erde 13: Die Afrikanischen Tagfalter. Plate XIII 12

Pierini
Butterflies described in 1776
Lepidoptera of Cape Verde
Butterflies of Africa
Taxa named by Pieter Cramer